VinSmart Research & Manufacturer Joint Stock Company is a member of Vingroup Joint Stock Company – one of the biggest wholly owned conglomerates in Vietnam, specialising in Technology, Industry, Commercials & Services. VinSmart was established in June 2018.

History 
VinSmart was founded in 2018 by Vingroup, with head office at Vinhomes Riverside, Long Biên District, Hanoi, Vietnam, first factory at Cát Hải District, Haiphong. The second factory was located at Hoa Lac Hi-tech Park, Thạch Thất District, Hanoi.

In 2020 the company presented a Vietnam-only VND600,000 (US$26) smartphone, the VSmart Bee Lite, subsidized in cooperation with Viettel. The phone is aimed at popularizing the brand and smartphones in general with the Vietnamese public.

At the Tech Awards 2020 competition in Vietnam, VinSmart has won many important awards.

 Vsmart won the Best Vietnamese Phone Brand award
 Vsmart Aris Pro won the phone award for leading the Vietnamese technology trend; Product Innovation Award
 Vsmart Live 4 won the best feature phone award

On 9 May 2021, VinSmart decided to stop manufacturing smartphones, marking the end of the 3-year journey of the Vietnamese company in making smarphones.

Leaders 
 Mai Hoa Tran: CEO

Products

Smartphones 

 VSmart Active 1
 VSmart Active 1+
 VSmart Active 3
 Vsmart Bee
 Vsmart Bee 3
 VSmart Joy 1
 VSmart Joy 1+
 VSmart Joy 2+
 VSmart Joy 3
 VSmart Joy 4
 Vsmart Live
 Vsmart Star
 Vsmart Star 3
 Vsmart Star 4
 VSmart Live 4 
 Vsmart Aris 
 Vsmart Aris Pro. Vsmart Aris 5G will be released in US

Smart TVs 

 55KE8500 55” 4K HDR10
 49KE8100 49" 4K HDR10
 55KD6800 55" 4K HDR10
 50KD6800 50" 4K HDR10
 43KD6600 43" 4K HDR10

See also 
 Archos
 BQ (company)
 Qualcomm
 Fujitsu
 MediaMarkt
 The Strong Source Holdings Company
 ZTE

References

External links 
 

Industry in Vietnam
Mobile phone manufacturers
Vietnamese brands
Vingroup
Vietnamese companies established in 2018
Electronics companies established in 2018